Naeem Khan (born 14 April 1971 in Sargodha, Pakistan) is a former Pakistani cricketer who played first-class cricket from 1985 to 1994.

A right-arm opening bowler, Naeem Khan made his first-class debut in the 1985-86 season. His best bowling figures came in 1986-87, when he took 8 for 25 for Sargodha. State Bank of Pakistan needed only 119 to win, but Khan bowled them out for 54. He also bowled Karachi Blues out for 54 in 1991-92, taking 6 for 19 (and 11 for 105 in the match, his best match figures).

In February 2021, he began to undertake coaching courses with the Pakistan Cricket Board.

References

External links
 Naeem Khan at CricketArchive

1971 births
Living people
Pakistani cricketers
Sargodha cricketers
Habib Bank Limited cricketers
Cricketers from Sargodha
Wiltshire cricketers